Highs in the Mid-Sixties, Volume 9 (subtitled Ohio) is a compilation album in the Highs in the Mid-Sixties series, featuring recordings that were released in Ohio.  Highs in the Mid-Sixties, Volume 21 is a later volume in the series that features bands from this state.

Release data
This album was released in 1984 as an LP by AIP Records (as #AIP-10015).

Notes on the tracks
Three members of the Choir would form the Raspberries with Eric Carmen in the early 1970s.  This track is the flip side of their first single; the classic A-side, "It's Cold Outside" can be found on Pebbles, Volume 2.  Another version of "Stepping Stone" is included on Highs in the Mid-Sixties, Volume 2.  These Squires and Outcasts are not the same bands that were included on Pebbles, Volume 1; according to some sources, the latter band is actually from Kentucky.  Phil Keaggy, who was evidently a member of the Squires, was a founding member of Glass Harp and later became a renowned contemporary Christian recording artist. The Human Beingz changed their name to the Human Beinz when Capitol Records misspelled it on their 1967 hit "Nobody But Me". The label promised to correct the mistake on future releases, but the single's success precluded that possibility.

Track listing

Side 1

 The Deadlys: "On the Road Again" (John Sebastian)
 The Gillian Row: "Gloria" (Van Morrison)
 The Squires: "Batmobile" (Phil Keaggy/Monus)
 The Denims: "Adler Sock, The" (The Denims)
 Bocky & the Visions: "The Spirit of '64" (R. Bobbins/J. Harris/T. Styles) — rel. 1964
 The Statesmen: "Stop and Get a Ticket" (Travers/Coventry)
 The Pied Pipers: "Hey Joe" (Billy Roberts)
 The Tree Stumps: "Jennie Lee" (Ron Jankowski)

Side 2
 The Dagenites: "I Don't Want to Try it Again" (Geoff Robinson)
 The Chylds: "Hey Girl" (J. Lepar/R. Fano/N. Boldi)
 The Choir: "I'm Going Home" (Dann Klawson)
 The Outcasts: "Loving You, Sometimes" (Collinsworth)
 The Sound Barrier: "Hey Hey" (Paul Hess)
 The Dantes: "Can't Get Enough of Your Love" (Harvey/Wehr)
 The Human Beingz: "Evil Hearted You" (Graham Gouldman)
 The Possums: "Stepping Stone" (Tommy Boyce/Bobby Hart)

Pebbles (series) albums
1984 compilation albums